Audrey Lindgren Gruger (May 17, 1930 – March 24, 2010) was an American politician who served as a member of the King County Council from 1982 to 1994. A member of the Democratic Party, she represented the 1st district.

References 

2010 deaths
King County Councillors
Democratic Party members of the Washington House of Representatives
1930 births
Women state legislators in Washington (state)